The Minister of Public Enterprises is a minister in the cabinet of the national government of South Africa. He is appointed by the President of South Africa and is the political head of the Department of Public Enterprises, which was established in 1999 and oversees various state-owned enterprises. Pravin Gordhan was appointed Minister of Public Enterprises by President Cyril Ramaphosa shortly after the latter's election in February 2018.

List of Ministers

References

Lists of political office-holders in South Africa